Third Generation Blues is an album by American folk music artist Doc Watson and his grandson Richard Watson, released in 1999.

Track listing
 "Honey Please Don't Go" (Bukka White) – 2:48
 "If I Were a Carpenter" (Tim Hardin) – 2:51
 "House of the Rising Sun" (Holmes, Ray) – 3:19
 "Gypsy Davey" (Ken Darby) – 4:34
 "St. James Infirmary" (Joe Primrose, Traditional) – 5:04
 "Uncloudy Day" (Josiah K. Alwood) – 2:51
 "South Coast" (Richard Dehr, Sam Eskin, Frank Miller, Lillian Bos Ross) – 4:05
 "Milk Cow Blues" (Kokomo Arnold) – 4:00
 "Train Whistle Blues" (Jimmie Rodgers) – 2:59
 "Moody River" (Gary D. Bruce) – 2:55
 "Columbus Stockade Blues" (Jimmie Davis, Eva Sagent) – 3:31
 "Walk on Boy" (Mel Tillis, Wayne Walker) – 3:08
 "Summertime" (George Gershwin, Ira Gershwin, DuBose Heyward) – 3:25
 "Precious Lord Take My Hand" (Thomas A. Dorsey, George Nelson Allen, Thomas Shepherd) – 2:47

Personnel
Doc Watson – guitar, harmonica, vocals
Richard Watson – guitar
T. Michael Coleman – bass
Production notes
Produced by Richard Watson
Engineered, mixed and mastered by Bill Wolf
Photography by Rosa Lee Watson
Design by Sue Meyer

References

External links
 Doc Watson discography

1999 albums
Doc Watson albums
Sugar Hill Records albums